Frances Wildt Pavlu, also known as Frances Pavlu and Hilda Pavlu, was a contemporary art jeweller and educator.

Early life and education
Born in the country formerly known as Czechoslovakia, migrated to Australia.

Frances Wildt Pavlu was educated at Royal Melbourne Institute of Technology, receiving a Diploma of Gold and Silversmithing, in 1975. In 1976, she gained a Crafts Certificate in Jewellery from Sir John Cass School of Art Institute. She also attended courses and worked in Pforzheim, West Germany and at Georg Jensen A/S in Copenhagen, Denmark.

Career
Frances Wildt Pavlu's jewellery was noted for its sculptural forms. She exhibited regularly in group and solo exhibitions. In 1971, she was a founding member of the Queensland Jewellery Workshop along with Kit Shannon, Jane Shannon, Merv Muhling and Don Ross. She was a lecturer at Queensland College of Art in the Gold and Silversmithing Department where she worked with Lyle Tweeddale, Maurice Maunsell and Jorgen de Voss.

Major exhibitions
 1975 Sculpture in Plastic and Silver, group exhibition, Fantasia Galleries at the Hibiscus Function Centre, Jamison, Canberra, Australia.
 1974 Solo Exhibition, Design Arts Centre, Brisbane, Australia.
 1972 Solo exhibition, Design Arts Centre, Brisbane, Australia.
 1972 First International Handicrafts Exhibition in Colombia.
 1970 Solo exhibition, Design Arts Centre, Brisbane, Australia.
 1970 Exhibited a collection of jewellery at the office of the Minister (Commercial) Australian Embassy, Tokyo, Japan.
 1970 Exhibited in the Australian Pavilion at Expo '70, Osaka, Japan.
 1968 Solo exhibition, Exhibition at Design Arts Centre, Brisbane, Australia.

Public collections
 Queensland Art Gallery Ring: Enigma key - a tautological paradox, 1980.
 Casa de la Cultura de Narino, Colombia, 1972.

Awards and nominations
 1972 First prize in the jewellery section of the Westfield Art Prize
 1972 Awarded one of two international equal prizes of the First International Handicrafts Exhibition, Colombia.
 1971 First and Second prize, Jewellery Section, Royal National Association, Brisbane, Australia.
 1968 Benvenuto Cellini Prize, Document of Honour, Munich.

References

External links
 Article with further information about Frances Wildt Pavlu

Australian women artists
2016 deaths
Date of birth missing